The Church of St. Monica, commonly referred to as St. Monica's, is a parish church in the Roman Catholic Archdiocese of New York, located at 413 East 79th Street, Manhattan, New York City. The parish was established in 1879 and in 2015 merged with nearby St. Elizabeth of Hungary and St. Stephen of Hungary churches.

History
The fourth Catholic parish on the Upper East Side, St. Monica's was founded by John Treanor, pastor of the Church of St. Lawrence O'Toole (now the Church of St. Ignatius Loyola). James J. Dougherty was appointed the first pastor, and in 1880 he began conducting Mass over a feed store at 404 East 78th Street. The following year, he purchased land for the construction of the church and school. Construction of the first church building was completed in 1883. In 1892, the address was listed as 409 East 79th Street.

John J. Boyle served as acting rector at St. Monica's before becoming the founding pastor of St. Luke's Church (Bronx, New York) in 1897.

In 2015, the Archdiocese of New York ordered St. Monica's merged  with St. Elizabeth's and St. Stephen's to better serve 21st century Yorkville. The merged parish, which holds services at St. Monica's, is known as the Roman Catholic Parish of St. Monica, St. Elizabeth and St. Stephens. As a result of the merger, St. Monica's parish boundaries shifted slightly.

Parish school
The parish school opened in 1883, operated by the Sisters of Charity of New York. The Sisters of St. Francis assumed operations in 1944. After several years of declining enrollment, the school was closed in 1974.

Buildings
The current Gothic Revival church building was erected in 1906 to the designs of Schickel & Ditmars, prominent church architects.

In 1926, the rector Arthur J. Kenny had a three- and four-story brick school and convent with tile roof built at 410 East 80th Street, to designs of Thomas Dunn for $120,000 ($ in current dollar terms). A three-story convent at 405–413 East 79th Street was built in 1955 to designs by Brown-Guenther-Booss for $275,000 ($ in current dollar terms).

Pastors
 John Treanor (1879–1880)
 James J. Dougherty (1880–1890s)
 John J. Boyle (Acting Rector in 1890s)
 James P. Hughes was assigned here (presumably as assistant) in 1904; while William S. Creedan was transferred from here to St. Andrew's Church (Manhattan)
 Arthur J. Kenny (1920s)
 James Henry Ambrose Griffiths (1955–1964), auxiliary bishop
Reverend Donald Baker (2015-present)

References

External links 
 Official website

Gothic Revival church buildings in New York City
Roman Catholic churches completed in 1906
20th-century Roman Catholic church buildings in the United States
Roman Catholic churches completed in 1955
Religious organizations established in 1879
Roman Catholic churches in Manhattan
Schickel & Ditmars church buildings
Upper East Side
1879 establishments in New York (state)